1172 Äneas  is a large Jupiter trojan from the Trojan camp, approximately  in diameter. It was discovered on 17 October 1930, by astronomer Karl Reinmuth at the Heidelberg Observatory in southwest Germany. The dark D-type asteroid is one of the largest Jupiter trojans and has a rotation period of 8.7 hours. It is named after the Trojan prince Aeneas, from Greek mythology.

Orbit and classification 

Äneas is located in the  Lagrangian point, 60° behind Jupiter in the so-called Trojan camp, orbiting in a 1:1 resonance . It is also a non-family asteroid of the Jovian background population.

It orbits the Sun at a distance of 4.7–5.8 AU once every 11 years and 11 months (4,354 days; semi-major axis of 5.22 AU). Its orbit has an eccentricity of 0.10 and an inclination of 17° with respect to the ecliptic. The body's observation arc begins with its official discovery observation at Heidelberg in October 1930.

Naming 

This minor planet was named after the Trojan hero Aeneas from Greek mythology. He is the son of goddess Aphrodite and Anchises of after whom 1173 Anchises was named. The  was mentioned in The Names of the Minor Planets by Paul Herget in 1955.

Physical characteristics

Rotation period 

Several rotational lightcurves of Äneas have been obtained since the first photometric observations by William Hartmann in 1988, that gave a period of 8.33 hours, and by Stefano Mottola and Anders Erikson in 1993, using the ESO 1-metre telescope at La Silla Observatory in Chile. Lightcurve analysis gave a rotation period of  hours with a brightness variation of  magnitude.

Follow-up observations during 2015–2017 by Robert Stephens and Daniel Coley at the Center for Solar System Studies gave three concurring periods of 8.701, 8.681 and 8.7 hours with an amplitude of 0.62, 0.40 and 0.21 magnitude, respectively, while in August 2011, Pierre Antonini reported a period of 11.8 hours based on a fragmentary lightcurve.

Diameter and albedo 

According to the surveys carried out by the Infrared Astronomical Satellite IRAS, the Japanese Akari satellite and the NEOWISE mission of NASA's Wide-field Infrared Survey Explorer, Äneas measures between 118.02 and 148.66 kilometers in diameter – making it anywhere from the 8th to 4th largest Jupiter trojan – determined from a common absolute magnitude of 8.33 and a surface albedo between 0.037 and 0.059. The Collaborative Asteroid Lightcurve Link adopts the results obtained by IRAS, that is, an albedo of 0.0403 and a diameter of 142.82 kilometers based on an absolute magnitude of 8.33.

Spectral type 

In the Tholen and Barucci classification, Äneas is a dark D-type asteroid, while in the Tedesco classification is as D/P-type asteroid. Its high V–I color index of 0.99 is typical for D-types.

Notes

References

External links 
 Largest Jupiter trojans SBDB, query
 Asteroid Lightcurve Database (LCDB), query form (info )
 Dictionary of Minor Planet Names, Google books
 Asteroids and comets rotation curves, CdR – Observatoire de Genève, Raoul Behrend
 Discovery Circumstances: Numbered Minor Planets (1)-(5000) – Minor Planet Center
 
 

001172
Discoveries by Karl Wilhelm Reinmuth
Named minor planets
001172
19301017